Jamal Kandi (also Romanized as Jamāl Kandī) is a village in Avajiq-e Shomali Rural District, Dashtaki District, Chaldoran County, West Azerbaijan Province, Iran. At the 2006 census, its population was 88, in 15 families.

References 

Populated places in Chaldoran County